This article lists the complete results of the knock out stage of the 2014 BWF World Junior Championships – Teams event in Alor Setar, Malaysia.

Bracket

Result

Quarter-finals

South Korea vs Thailand

Indonesia vs Hong Kong

Japan vs Chinese Taipei

China vs Malaysia

Semi-final

Thailand vs Indonesia

Japan vs China

Final

Indonesia vs China

References

2014 BWF World Junior Championships
2014 in youth sport